EKV may refer to:

Exoatmospheric Kill Vehicle, the non-explosive warhead of an antimissile system.
Ekatarina Velika, a rock band from Belgrade, Yugoslavia (now Serbia)
EKV (Enz, Krummenacher, Vittoz) compact/spice mosfet model